Ali Al-Asmari (born 12 January 1997) is a Saudi Arabian footballer who plays as a midfielder for Saudi Arabian club Al-Ahli.

Career statistics

Club

External links

References

1997 births
Living people
Sportspeople from Jeddah
Saudi Arabian footballers
Association football midfielders
Al-Ahli Saudi FC players
Ohod Club players
Saudi Professional League players
Saudi First Division League players
Saudi Arabia youth international footballers
Saudi Arabia international footballers
Footballers at the 2018 Asian Games
Asian Games competitors for Saudi Arabia
20th-century Saudi Arabian people
21st-century Saudi Arabian people